"Gucci Flip Flops" is a song by American rapper Bhad Bhabie featuring fellow American rapper Lil Yachty, released on March 26, 2018 as the second single from the former's debut mixtape 15 (2018). The song was produced by 30 Roc and Cheeze Beatz.

Composition
The song sees the rappers rapping about them living luxuriously, over a "bouncy" trap instrumental. Bhad Bhabie targets her haters in the first verse, while Lil Yachty raps the second verse.

Music video
A music video directed by Nicholaus Goossen was released on May 1, 2018. Shot in black and white, it uses a 1950s theme as well as inspiration from the sitcom Leave It to Beaver and the film Pleasantville. It depicts Bhad Bhabie as the daughter of a family watching television in their home. Bhabie and Yachty appear on the TV screen in color, rapping the song. While the parents are disgusted, their son is interested in the performance. A milkman (played by David Spade) arrives to make a delivery, but is cursed at and dismissed by Bhabie. By the end of the video, the family becomes fans of Bhad Bhabie, with their appearances changed.

Remix
The official remix features American rappers Plies and Snoop Dogg. It was released on October 2, 2018.

Charts

Certifications

References

2018 singles
2018 songs
Bhad Bhabie songs
Lil Yachty songs
Atlantic Records singles
Songs written by Bhad Bhabie
Songs written by Lil Yachty
Songs written by 30 Roc